Harvey Lyon Secter  was the chancellor of the University of Manitoba, Canada, from 2010 - 2019.
Secter received an honorary doctorate from the University of Winnipeg.

References

Year of birth missing (living people)
Living people
Canadian university and college chancellors
University of Manitoba
Members of the Order of Canada
Businesspeople from Winnipeg